Marlin Theodore "Pee Wee" Carter (December 27, 1912 – December 20, 1993) was an American baseball infielder in the Negro leagues. Carter played from 1932 to 1951 with the Memphis Red Sox, Cincinnati Tigers, and the Chicago American Giants and appeared in the East-West All-Star Game in 1942. Carter served in the U.S. Coast Guard from 1943 to 1945.

References

External links
 and Baseball-Reference Black Baseball stats and Seamheads
Negro League Baseball Players Association

1912 births
1993 deaths
Chicago American Giants players
Cincinnati Tigers players
Memphis Red Sox players
Monroe Monarchs players
Baseball infielders
Baseball players from Texas
United States Coast Guard enlisted
People from Shelby County, Texas
African Americans in World War II
United States Coast Guard personnel of World War II
African-American United States Coast Guard personnel